Centerville is an unincorporated community in Grass Township, Spencer County, in the U.S. state of Indiana.

History
Centerville had its start in the early 1840s. An old variant name of the community was Oakland. A post office called Oakland was established in 1847, and remained in operation until it was discontinued in 1895.

Geography

References

Unincorporated communities in Spencer County, Indiana
Unincorporated communities in Indiana